Sammy Figueroa (born November 16, 1948, The Bronx, New York) is an American percussionist. At 18 he joined the band of bassist Bobby Valentín and also co-led the Brazilian/Latin fusion group Raíces.

Selected Discography

As leader or co-leader
Solo
 Talisman (2014, Savant, SCD 2144) with Glaucia Nasser
 Memory of Water (2015, Ashe Records)
 Imaginary World (2015, Savant, SCD 2151)

With Sammy Figueroa & His Latin Jazz Explosion
 ...and Sammy Walked In (2006, Savant Records 2066)
 The Magician (2007, Savant 2079)
 Urban Nature (2011, Senator Records, SEN-1001)

As sideman

With Deodato
 Very Together (1976)

With Average White Band
 AWB (1974)
 Cupid's in Fashion (1982)
 Soul Tattoo (1996)

With George Benson
 In Your Eyes (Warner Bros., 1983)

With Blondie
 The Hunter (Chrysalis, 1982)

With Tommy Bolin
 Teaser (Nemperor, 1975)

With David Bowie
 Let's Dance (EMI, 1983)
 Tonight (EMI, 1984)

With The Brecker Brothers
 Back to Back (1976)
 Don’t Stop the Music (1977)
 Straphangin' (1981)

With Paul Carrack
 Groove Approved (Chrysalis, 1989)

With Chic
 Chic (1977)
 C'est Chic (1978)
 Risqué (1979)
 Real People (1980)
 Take It Off (1981)
 Tongue in Chic (1982)

With Joe Cocker
 Unchain My Heart (Capitol, 1987)

With Miles Davis
 The Man with the Horn (1981)

With Joey DeFrancesco
 Where Were You? (1990)
 In the Key of the Universe (2019)

With Al Foster
 Mr. Foster (1979)

With Hiroshi Fukumura
 Hot Shot (1985)

With Bee Gees
 E.S.P. (Warner Bros., 1987)

With Debbie Gibson
 Body, Mind, Soul (Atlantic, 1993)

With Dave Grusin
 West Side Story (1997)

With Gwen Guthrie
 Just for You (Island, 1985)

With Hall & Oates
 Ooh Yeah! (Arista, 1988)

With Major Harris
 How Do You Take Your Love (RCA Victor, 1978)

With Debbie Harry
 KooKoo (Chrysalis, 1981)

With Nicole Henry
 The Very Thought of You (Banister, 2008)

With Whitney Houston
 Whitney (Arista, 1987)

With Grayson Hugh
 Road to Freedom (MCA, 1992)

With Etta Jones
 Christmas with Etta Jones (Muse, 1990)
 Reverse the Charges (Muse, 1992)

With Mick Jagger
 She's the Boss (Columbia, 1985)

With France Joli
 Now! (Prelude, 1982)

With Stanley Jordan
 Magic Touch (1985)

With Chaka Khan
 Naughty (Warner Bros., 1980)
 Chaka Khan (Warner Bros., 1982)

With Ben E. King
 Music Trance (Atlantic, 1980)

With Carole King
 City Streets (Capitol, 1989)

With Earl Klugh
 Wishful Thinking (1986)

With Melissa Manchester
 Hey Ricky (Arista, 1982)

With Herbie Mann
 Peace Pieces - The Music of Bill Evans (1995)

With Jay McShann
 The Big Apple Bash (Arista, 1979)

With Bette Midler
 Thighs and Whispers (Atlantic, 1979)

With Stephanie Mills
 Tantalizingly Hot (Casablanca, 1982)

With Charles Mingus
 Me, Myself an Eye (1979) Mingus does not play on this posthumous recording

With Bob Mintzer Big Band
 Departure (1993)

With Mark Murphy
 What a Way to Go (Muse, 1990)
 I'll Close My Eyes (Muse, 1991)

With Odyssey
 Hang Together (RCA Victor, 1980)

With Yoko Ono
 It's Alright (I See Rainbows) (Polydor, 1982)

With Jimmy Ponder
 Come On Down (1991)

With Sonny Rollins
 Road Shows, Vol. 1 (2008)
 Road Shows, Vol. 2 (2011)
 Road Shows, Vol. 3 (2014)

With David Lee Roth
 Crazy from the Heat (Warner Bros., 1985)
 Eat 'Em and Smile (Warner Bros., 1986)

With Diana Ross
 The Boss (Motown, 1979)
 Red Hot Rhythm & Blues (EMI, 1987)

With Leo Sayer
 World Radio (Chrysalis, 1982)

With John Scofield
 Who's Who? (1979)

With Sister Sledge
 We Are Family (1979)

With Patti Smith
 Dream of Life (Arista, 1988)

With Spyro Gyra
 Three Wishes (1992)

With Billy Squier
 Tell the Truth (Capitol, 1993)

With Candi Staton
 Candi Staton (Warner Bros., 1980)

With Peter Tosh
 Mystic Man (EMI, 1979)

With Luther Vandross
 Forever, for Always, for Love (1982)

With Narada Michael Walden
 Garden of Love Light (Arista, 1976)
 I Cry, I Smile (Arista, 1977)

With Dionne Warwick
 How Many Times Can We Say Goodbye (Arista, 1983)

With Steven Van Zandt
 Men Without Women (EMI, 1982)

References

External links

  www.SammyFigueroa.com
 All About Jazz article
 Sammy Figueroa discography and album reviews, credits & releases at AllMusic
 Sammy Figueroa discography, album releases & credits at Discogs
 Sammy Figueroa albums to be listened as stream on Spotify

American jazz drummers
American jazz percussionists
Latin jazz percussionists
Living people
Musicians from New York City
People from the Bronx
Jazz musicians from New York (state)
1948 births